The Alliance of Movements for the Emergence of Niger (AMEN AMIN) is a political party in Niger.

History
The party was launched in 2015 by Minister of Industrial Development Oumarou Hamidou Tchiana, a former secretary general of the Nigerien Democratic Movement for an African Federation.

The party did not nominate a presidential candidate in the 2016 general elections, but won three seats in the National Assembly.

References

Political parties in Niger
Political parties established in 2015
2015 establishments in Niger